Patrick Antwi (born 4 November 1987, in Prestea) is a Ghanaian football player who currently plays for Ebusua Dwarfs.

Career 
Antwi began his career by second division club Prestea Mine Stars F.C. and was later transferred to Liberty Professionals FC, in May 2009 signed with Tema Youth. He joined in summer 2010 back to Liberty Professionals F.C. After three years signed in September 2012 for Essienimpong Cape-Coast Mysterious Dwarfs Ebusua Dwarfs.

International 
He made his debut for the Ghana national team in a friendly against Mexico in London during March 2008. Antwi played the second half of the match because Ghana's usual deputy goalkeeper, Abdul Fatawu Dauda, was unable to travel to the United Kingdom in time for the match.

References

1987 births
Living people
Ghanaian footballers
Association football goalkeepers
Ghana international footballers
Liberty Professionals F.C. players
Tema Youth players